Arturo L. Goetz (24 June 1944 – 28 July 2014) was an Argentine film actor. He worked in the cinema of Argentina.

He studied for a Doctor of Philosophy degree in economics at Jesus College, Oxford, from 1971 to 1974, and published his findings on Argentine industrialization in 1976. Whilst at Jesus College, he played football for the college team and polo for the university team. After leaving Oxford, he worked as an economist at the United Nations in Geneva, and then at the Food and Agriculture Organization in Rome, where he worked on food security and South-South cooperation. He returned to Argentina in 1982 and established a treaty for South-South cooperation on food security for Latin America (Comite de Acción sobre Seguridad Alimentaria Regional, CASAR) as well as the non-profit Fundación CREAR, promoting development projects in Argentina. He took formal acting lessons after turning 50, having previously acted as an amateur.

Partial filmography

 Cómplices (1998) - Comisario
 El Amateur (aka The Amateur) (1999) - Concejal
 El Camino (aka The Road) (2000) - Francisco Irureta
 Plan (2000, Short) 
 Four Aims and Flyin' Shoes (2001) - Gustavo
 The Holy Girl (2004) - Dr. Vesalio
 Cama adentro (aka Live-In Maid) (2004) - Invitado en el Country
 Derecho de familia (aka Family Law)  (2006) - Bernardo Perelman
 The Other (aka El Otro)  (2007) - Escribano
 El asaltante (aka "The mugger) (2007) - Asaltante
 La Novia errante (2007) - Padre
 El nido vacio (2008) - Dr. Sprivak
 La sangre brota (2008) - Arturo
 The Window (2008) - Médico
 The City of Your Final Destination (2009) - Mrs. Van Euwen's Guest
 En nuestros corazones para siempre (2009)
 Il richiamo (2009) - Dr. Garcia
 El cuarto de Leo (2009) - Juan
 Los condenados (2009) - Raúl
 Rompecabezas (2010) - Roberto
 Sin retorno (2010) - El Liquidador
 Desmadre (2011) - Eduardo
 La Guerra del Cerdo (2012)
 Errata (2012)
 La sublevación (2012)
 Mala (2013) - Marido de Mónica
 Bolishopping (2013)
 Lock Charmer (2014) - Mario
 Ciencias naturales (2014) - Arturo
 Death in Buenos Aires'' (2014) - Hombre Polo

References

External links
 

1944 births
2014 deaths
Argentine male film actors
Argentine economists
People from Buenos Aires
Alumni of Jesus College, Oxford
Argentine people of German descent